The World Federation of Medical Managers is an international federation of medical colleges specialising in health management and leadership

Membership
Currently, the organisation has ten Member Organisations:

 American Association for Physician Leadership (AAPL)
 Canadian Society of Physician Executives (CSPE)
 College of Medical Administrators of Sri Lanka (CMASL)
 Danish Medical Association (DMA)
 UK Faculty of Medical Leadership and Management (FMLM)
 Hong Kong College of Community Medicine (HKCCM)
 Israeli Society of Medical Management (ISMM)
 Italian Society of Medical Managers (SIMM)
 Royal Australasian College of Medical Administrators (RACMA)
 South African Society of Medical Managers (SASMM)

Leadership
WFMM is currently chaired by the Royal Australasian College of Medical Administrators.

References

International medical and health organizations